Haçatala is a village and municipality in the Qusar Rayon of Azerbaijan. It has a population of 271.  The municipality consists of the villages of Haçatala and Gican.

References

Populated places in Qusar District